The eleventh season of the American television series Bones premiered on October 1, 2015, on Fox and concluded on July 21, 2016. The show maintained its timeslot, airing on Thursdays at 8:00 pm ET.

Cast and characters

Main cast
 Emily Deschanel as Dr. Temperance "Bones" Brennan, a forensic anthropologist at the Jeffersonian, and wife of Seeley Booth
 David Boreanaz as  FBI Special Agent Seeley Booth and husband of Temperance Brennan
 Michaela Conlin as Angela Montenegro, a forensic artist and wife of Jack Hodgins
 Tamara Taylor as Dr. Camille Saroyan, a forensic pathologist and the head of the forensic division
 T. J. Thyne as Dr. Jack Hodgins, an entomologist, mineralogist, palynologist, and forensic chemist, and husband of Angela Montenegro.
 John Boyd as James Aubrey, an FBI agent who works under Booth

Recurring cast
 Patricia Belcher as Caroline Julian, a prosecutor who often works with the team
 Ryan O'Neal as Max Brennan, Temperance's father
 Gil Darnell as Sebastian Kohl, a famous photographer who mentors Angela, and Cam's boyfriend
 Sunnie Pelant as Christine Booth, Seeley and Temperance's daughter
 Sara Rue as Karen Delfs, a behavioral analyst
 Kim Raver as Grace Miller, an FBI special agent
 Dilshad Vadsaria as Padme Dalaj, Jared Booth's wife
 Gavin MacIntosh as Parker Booth, Seeley's son
 Eric Millegan as Dr. Zack Addy, former Jeffersonian employee

Interns
 Carla Gallo as Daisy Wick
 Eugene Byrd as Dr. Clark Edison
 Michael Grant Terry as Wendell Bray
 Pej Vahdat as Dr. Arastoo Vaziri
 Brian Klugman as Dr. Oliver Wells
 Ignacio Serricchio as Rodolfo Fuentes
 Laura Spencer as Jessica Warren
 Joel David Moore as Dr. Colin Fisher

Production
The series was renewed for an eleventh season by Fox on May 8, 2015. Writers Michael Peterson and Jonathan Collier took over the role of showrunner for the eleventh season after executive producer and writer Stephen Nathan stepped down from the position after season 10, to work on other projects. However, Nathan plans to return to the series later in the season. Randy Zisk joined as an executive producer and assumed the role of the series' directing producer, previous held by Ian Toynton since the beginning of the series. In July 2015, it was announced that Bones would crossover with fellow Fox series Sleepy Hollow in a two-part episode, which aired on October 29, 2015, and featured guest appearances by Tom Mison and Nicole Beharie. Filming began on August 3, 2015. Kim Raver was cast as FBI Special Agent Grace Miller and appears in the first two episodes of the season. Betty White guest stars in an episode, playing Dr. Beth Mayer, a forensic anthropologist. In November 2015, it was announced that Sara Rue had been cast in a multi-episode arc as a behavioral analyst who works with Booth.

Episodes

DVD release
The eleventh season of Bones was released on DVD (subtitled "Death and Disappearance Edition") in region 1 on January 3, 2017. The set includes all 22 episodes of season eleven and special features include deleted scenes and a gag reel.

References

External links
 
 

Season 11
2015 American television seasons
2016 American television seasons